Rineloricaria reisi is a species of catfish in the family Loricariidae. It is native to South America, where it occurs in the Uruguay River basin, specifically the Piratini River and the Conceição River in Brazil, as well as Misiones Province in Argentina. The species reaches 19.8 cm (7.8 inches) in standard length and is believed to be a facultative air-breather.

References 

Loricariini
Fish described in 2008